Ocean pools are an important feature of the Australian coastline particularly in New South Wales. Ocean pools or ocean baths are defined as public seawater pools sited on a rocky surf coast, so that waves can wash into the pool. The width, length and depth of ocean pools varies and often depends on their location on the coastline. Australia also has many harbour pools and these are usually netted or fenced and located in harbours or river mouths but not regarded as ocean pools.

History

Ocean pools date back to the convict era in Australia with Newcastle's Bogey Hole being constructed in 1819 by convicts under the orders of Commandant James Morisset. Construction of ocean pools was generally through community subscriptions or government funded. Two ocean pools  were privately built: the Pearl Beach Rock Pool, near Gosford, New South Wales was constructed by a real estate developer in the 1920s to help sell land, and Wylie's Baths in Coogee, New South Wales by entrepreneur Henry Wylie and his sons.

Several ocean pools were once reserved only for the use of men or only for use by women and children and Sydney's Coogee Bay still hosts an ocean pool reserved solely for the use of women and children. Coogee's McIver's Baths constructed in the 1860s seems to now be the only seawater pool in Australia still reserved solely for use by women and children. Fanny Durack and Mina Wylie, who won gold and silver medals in the Women's 100m Freestyle at the 1912 Stockholm Olympics trained at this pool. The Beverley Whitfield Pool in Shellharbour is named after another of Australia's Olympic swimmers.

Wylie's Baths established in 1907 at Coogee, New South Wales, by Henry Alexander Wylie, the father of Mina Wylie, was one of the first mixed gender ocean pools in Australia.

There are about 100 ocean pools in New South Wales. In Perth, Western Australia there has been impetus to build ocean pools as a result of shark attacks.

List of ocean pools

References

Bibliography
 McDermott, Marie-Louise. Wet, wild and convivial: past, present and future contributions of Australia’s ocean pools to surf, beach, pool and body cultures and recreational coasts. PhD, Edith Cowan University, 2012
 McDermott, Marie-Louise. Ocean baths. Dictionary of Sydney, 2011

External links
Flickr New South Wales Ocean Baths
Ocean Pools NSW

Swimming venues in Australia
Swimming in Australia
Lists of sports venues in Australia
Coastline of Australia